The Treaty of Novgorod, signed in 1537 between the Grand Duchy of Moscow and Sweden, was a truce set to expire in sixty years. The truce lasted until the outbreak of the Russo-Swedish War (1554–1557), which was ended by the Treaty of Novgorod (1557), in a truce set likewise to expire in 1597.

Sources

Novgorod
Treaties of Sweden
1537 treaties